Malcolm A. MacIntyre (January 28, 1908 – May 6, 1992), born in Boston, Massachusetts, was an American lawyer and hall of fame lacrosse player. He attended Yale University and Oxford University before returning to Yale Law School to receive his J.S.D. After receiving his law degree he became a practicing attorney in New York City where he specialized in corporate law and performed legal services for American Airlines. During World War II he served in the Military Air Transport Service where he became acquainted with James H. Douglas, Jr. In 1957 Douglas, who was Secretary of the Air Force, invited MacIntyre to serve as Under Secretary of the Air Force. MacIntyre held the Under Secretary position for two years. In 1959 he resigned to become president of Eastern Air Lines. In 1964 he became executive vice president of Martin Marietta Corporation where he worked until he retired in 1973.

MacIntyre played four years of lacrosse while at Yale and was a first-team All-American his senior year. He continued to play at Oxford where he won three letters. In 1931, he toured the United States with an Oxford-Cambridge team which defeated both Army and Navy. While in England, he was selected three times to the All-Star English team. He coached Yale's lacrosse team when he returned for law school. In 1966, he was inducted into the National Lacrosse Hall of Fame.

He was the father of Clare MacIntyre, the woman who was the inspiration for Harry Chapin's 1972 song Taxi. Chapin's relationship with MacIntyre and his daughter also inspired the 1976 song The Mayor of Candor Lied.

References

External links
  Papers of Malcolm A. MacIntyre, Dwight D. Eisenhower Presidential Library

1908 births
1992 deaths
American Rhodes Scholars
New York (state) lawyers
Eastern Air Lines
United States Department of Defense officials
United States Air Force officers
Alumni of Brasenose College, Oxford
Yale Law School alumni
American lacrosse players
20th-century American lawyers
Martin Marietta people